"Kiss" is Japanese recording artist, Mai Kuraki's sixteenth single released on April 30, 2003. The single peaked at number 3 on the Oricon singles chart and spent three weeks in the top 20 of the chart. It stayed on the chart for nine weeks, the last being July 7, 2003. It was certified Gold by the Recording Industry Association of Japan (RIAJ) for shipments of 100,000 copies.

Track listing

Charts

References

External links
Mai Kuraki Discography

Songs about kissing
2003 singles
2003 songs
Mai Kuraki songs
Songs with music by Akihito Tokunaga
Songs written by Mai Kuraki
Giza Studio singles
Song recordings produced by Daiko Nagato